Bell City is a city in northeastern Stoddard County, Missouri, United States. It was founded as a sawmill town circa 1900, and lies at the foothills of Crowley's Ridge on Missouri Route 91. The population was 448 at the 2010 census. Dorothy Burton is the current mayor.

History
A post office called Bell City has been in operation since 1890. The community was named after brothers Gesper Albert and Ralford Stephen Bell, proprietors of a local sawmill. Bell City was situated along the St. Louis Southwestern Railway.

Geography
Bell City is located on the western edge of the lowland region of southeast Missouri. Sikeston lies 15 miles to the southeast. The head of Little River is three miles to the east. Missouri Route 91 passes through the community, connecting with U.S. Route 61 at Morley, ten miles to the east.

Demographics

2010 census
As of the census of 2010, there were 448 people, 182 households, and 124 families living in the city. The racial makeup of the city was 94.64% White, 1.79% Black or African American, 1.34% Native American, and 2.23% from two or more races. Hispanic or Latino of any race were 0.22% of the population.

There were 182 households, of which 37.4% had children under the age of 18 living with them, 47.3% were married couples living together, 12.6% had a female householder with no husband present, 8.2% had a male householder with no wife present, and 31.9% were non-families. 26.9% of all households were made up of individuals, and 12.6% had someone living alone who was 65 years of age or older. The average household size was 2.46 and the average family size was 2.98.

The median age in the city was 36.6 years. 25% of residents were under the age of 18; 11.7% were between the ages of 18 and 24; 25.3% were from 25 to 44; 26.1% were from 45 to 64; and 12.1% were 65 years of age or older. The gender makeup of the city was 50.7% male and 49.3% female.

2000 census
As of the census of 2000, there were 461 people, 196 households, and 126 families living in the city. The population density was 830.9 people per square mile (323.6/km2). There were 220 housing units at an average density of 396.5 per square mile (154.4/km2). The racial makeup of the city was 98.48% White, 1.08% African American, 0.22% Native American, and 0.22% from two or more races. Hispanic or Latino of any race were 0.87% of the population.

There were 196 households, out of which 36.2% had children under the age of 18 living with them, 45.4% were married couples living together, 15.3% had a female householder with no husband present, and 35.7% were non-families. 34.2% of all households were made up of individuals, and 13.8% had someone living alone who was 65 years of age or older. The average household size was 2.35 and the average family size was 3.02.

In the city the population was spread out, with 28.9% under the age of 18, 8.9% from 18 to 24, 27.5% from 25 to 44, 21.5% from 45 to 64, and 13.2% who were 65 years of age or older. The median age was 35 years. For every 100 females, there were 85.1 males. For every 100 females age 18 and over, there were 77.3 males.

The median income for a household in the city was $23,125, and the median income for a family was $28,636. Males had a median income of $22,125 versus $16,333 for females. The per capita income for the city was $12,664. About 11.8% of families and 19.4% of the population were below the poverty line, including 27.1% of those under age 18 and 23.7% of those age 65 or over.

Notable People
 Dave Barham - Founded Hot Dog on a Stick

References

Cities in Stoddard County, Missouri
1890 establishments in Missouri
Cities in Missouri